Rolf Karl Heinz Grantsau (March 25, 1928 Kiel – June 25, 2015) was a German-Brazilian naturalist and illustrator.

Biography

Grantsau was born in 1928 in Kiel, Germany. While graduating in biology, he was a student of Erwin Stresemann. The birds-of-paradise and the hummingbirds were the groups he most appreciated while in Germany, and he eventually came to Brazil in 1962 to study the later; he also worked with taxonomy of the birds, mammals, reptiles, insects, orchids, carnivorous plants, lichens and more, and as a taxidermist. He was also an illustrator, having illustrated his own work (including books) and of many other researchers.

He was married to Ilse Grantsau, with whom he had two children, Marion Grantsau Engelbrecht, born in Germany, and Ingo Gratsau, born in Brazil. 

The following species and subspecies were described by him:
Augastes scutatus ilseae 1967
Phaethornis maranhaoensis 1968
Threnetes loehkeni 1969
Eupetonema macroura cyanoviridis 1988
Hylocharis cyanus griseiventris 1988
Phaethornis ochraceiventris camargoi(= Phaethornis margarettae) 1988
Phaethornis pretrei minor 1988
Amazona kawalli 1989 (with Hélio Camargo)
Charadrius wilsonia brasiliensis 2008 (with P.C. Lima)
Caprimulgus longirostris pedrolimai 2008

The species Drosera grantsaui (a carnivorous plant), Gnomidolon grantasaui (a beetle) and Formicivora grantsaui (a Thamnophilidae) were named after him.

References

20th-century German zoologists
1928 births
2015 deaths
Scientists from Kiel
German emigrants to Brazil